Redang Island (  / 中文：热浪岛) is an island in Kuala Nerus District, Terengganu, Malaysia. It is one of the largest islands off the east coast of Peninsular Malaysia and as well as one of the most beautiful islands in the world. It is famous for its crystal clear waters and white sandy beaches. It is one of nine islands, which form a marine sanctuary park offering snorkeling and diving opportunities for tourists.

Archipelago
The Redang archipelago comprises Pulau Redang, Pulau Lima, Pulau Paku Besar, Pulau Paku Kecil, Pulau Kerengga Kecil, Pulau Kerengga Besar, Pulau Ekor Tebu, Pulau Ling and Pulau Pinang. The boundary of the Pulau Redang Marine Park is established by a line linking all points  from the shores of Pulau Redang, Pulau Lima, Pulau Ekor Tebu and Pulau Pinang. The other nearby islands of Pulau Perhentian Besar, Pulau Perhentian Kecil, Pulau Lang Tengah, Pulau Kapas and Pulau Susu Dara are also gazetted and protected as Marine Parks. Today, only the bigger islands like Redang, Lang Tengah, Perhentian and Kapas have resort facilities for visitors. The management of Marine Parks primarily involves protection of the sensitive marine and terrestrial ecosystems by controlling the impact from human activities. These include waste pollution management and conservation of coral reefs and terrestrial habitats.

Tourism
 
In contrast to the neighbouring Perhentian Islands, Redang has a more upmarket image, as almost all accommodation on the island is resort-based. The largest beach is Pasir Panjang on the east side, featuring half a dozen resorts. The beach is covered with soft white sand. Coral and fish can be seen just a few metres from the beach. The other beach resorts are located in Teluk Dalam on the north and Teluk Kalong to the south. 
 	
The 2000 film, Summer Holiday was filmed on the Laguna Redang Island Resort, and a replica of the tea house now serves as the resort's gift shop. 

Summer Collection is one of the most popular oldest souvenir, beachwear, and swimwear seller on the island after the island became famous through the film. They started their business about 20 years ago at Redang Pelangi Resort. 

The island is a turtle nesting site, and these turtles serve as a draw for ecotourism.

Climate

Like the rest of Malaysia's east coast, Redang is affected by the northeast monsoon from the South China Sea, so most resorts are closed and ferry transport schedules are severely restricted between October and March. The amount of monthly rainfall varies throughout the year, with November to February being the wettest months, whilst April to August being the driest.

Transportation
Access is from Merang or Shahbandar jetty on boats operated by the resorts. If opting for air travel, SKS Airways also provides daily scheduled flights from Subang Airport. Berjaya Air is also available for charter flights to the island from both Subang Airport and Singapore's Seletar Airport.

Features

See also
List of islands of Malaysia
List of islands in the South China Sea

References

External links

 SEATRU - A sea turtle project in Redang, Malaysia
 Tourism Malaysia - Pulau Redang
 

Kuala Nerus District
Islands of Terengganu
Tourist attractions in Terengganu